Deulpota Bhagbat Balika Vidyalaya is the girls' school in the village Deulpota (Khejuri) of sub-division Contai, Purba Medinipur, West Bengal, India. It is a secondary school.

The school follows the course curricula of West Bengal Board of Secondary Education (WBBSE) for standard 10th Board examinations.

High schools and secondary schools in West Bengal
Girls' schools in West Bengal
Schools in Purba Medinipur district
Educational institutions in India with year of establishment missing